Matthew Bair (born June 2, 1987), known professionally as Matthew Koma, is an American singer, songwriter, DJ and record producer. Songs written by Koma include "Spectrum" and Grammy Award-winner "Clarity", both performed by Zedd. Koma has collaborated with Hardwell, Zedd, Miriam Bryant, Sebastian Ingrosso, Alesso, Afrojack, Tiësto, Vicetone and Ryan Tedder of OneRepublic.

Early life
Koma was born in Brooklyn and raised in Seaford, New York, on Long Island. His father, Gerald D. Bair, was a singer/songwriter and Koma first performed on stage with his father when he was four years old. Koma wrote his first song when he was nine years old and credits Elvis Costello and Bruce Springsteen for his inspiration at a young age. Koma attended Seaford High School. His older half brother, Kris Mazzarisi, is also a musician.

Musical career
In June 2011, Jimmy Iovine signed Koma to Interscope Records after watching an acoustic performance of the record "She".

In May 2012, Koma released his first EP, Parachute, in which he wrote, produced and co-produced all four tracks with collaborators Twice as Nice, Alex da Kid, Sam Watters, Louis Biancaniello, and Ari Levine.

Also in 2012, he performed at the Sorry for Party Rocking Tour with LMFAO and Far East Movement, In the fall of 2012, he toured with Owl City.

In March 2012, Bruce Springsteen released "Rocky Ground", a remix that Koma co-produced with Ron Aniello as a single from his album Wrecking Ball.

In July 2012, Koma did the main vocals for the song "End of Pretend" by Black Cards.

In April 2013, he toured Europe supporting Ellie Goulding alongside Charli XCX.

In November 2013, Koma and DJ Hardwell released the single "Dare You",

In March 2014, Showtek's "Cannonball (Earthquake)", featuring Koma, was released. In April 2014, Koma appeared on RAC's debut album, featuring on the single "Cheap Sunglasses". In May 2014, Koma was featured on Audien's single "Serotonin". Also in May 2014, Afrojack's album Forget the World, which featured two songs written and sung by Koma, "Keep our Love Alive" and "Illuminate", was released.

In January 2015, Koma was featured in Kia Motors' online video series Rediscovered, where he recorded a cover of The Miracles' "The Tracks of My Tears" before Smokey Robinson made a surprise visit in the studio.

Koma collaborated with The Knocks on "I Wish (My Taylor Swift)", which was released as a single in September 2015 and later appeared on the Knocks' 2016 album, 55.

In 2016, he worked with Britney Spears on her album Glory producing the song “Swimming in the Stars”, which was released in 2020.

In June 2017, Koma produced several tracks for Shania Twain's fifth studio album Now, including the lead single "Life's About to Get Good".

In November 2017, he was featured on the Downes Braide Association album Skyscraper Souls.

In August 2018, he premiered "On the 5", both single and video under his new project, Winnetka Bowling League via RCA Records.

In August 2020, he co-wrote and co-produced the single "Change Your Mind" by Keith Urban.

Personal life

Relationships and family
From 2012 until 2015, Koma dated Carly Rae Jepsen, after meeting while they were working on her album Kiss.

In May 2019, he got engaged to Hilary Duff and they were married in December 2019 at their home in Los Angeles, after three years of dating. They have two daughters, Banks Violet Bair, born in October 2018 and Mae James Bair, born in 2021. He is also a stepfather to Duff's son, Luca, from her previous marriage to ice-hockey player Mike Comrie.

Anorexia
In May 2017, he released "Dear Ana", a song about his anorexia and confessed that the disease almost killed him.

Awards and nominations
{| class="wikitable sortable plainrowheaders"
|-
! scope="col" | Award
! scope="col" | Year
! scope="col" | Category
! scope="col" | Nominee(s)
! scope="col" | Result
! scope="col" class="unsortable"| 
|-
! scope="row"|BMI Pop Awards
| 2014
| Award-Winning Song
| "Clarity"
| 
|
|-
! scope="row"|Billboard Music Awards
| 2012
| Top Dance/Club Song
| "Spectrum"
| 
|
|-
! scope="row" rowspan=2|International Dance Music Awards
| 2013
| Best Progressive Track
| "Years"
| 
|
|-
| 2016
| Best Dubstep/Drum & Bass Track
| "Emotional"
| 
|
|-
! scope="row"|MTV Video Music Awards Japan
| 2012
| Best Dance Video
| "Spectrum"
| 
|

Discography

References

External links
 

1987 births
21st-century American singers
21st-century American male singers
American dance musicians
American electronic musicians
American male singer-songwriters
American pop musicians
American rock musicians
American rock singers
American rock songwriters
Countertenors
DJs from New York City
Living people
Musicians from Brooklyn
People from Long Island
Singer-songwriters from New York (state)